Aniseia is a genus of flowering plants belonging to the family Convolvulaceae.

Its native range is Tropical and Subtropical America.

Species:

Aniseia argentina 
Aniseia luxurians 
Aniseia martinicensis

References

Convolvulaceae
Convolvulaceae genera
Taxa named by Jacques Denys Choisy